Francisco Javier Narbón Cuadra (born February 11, 1995) is a Panamanian footballer who plays for Plaza Amador and the Panama national football team.

Career

Youth and College
Narbón spent his youth career with the Shattuck-Saint Mary's Soccer Academy as well as Chepo before signing a letter of intent to play college soccer at James Madison University.  He made 16 appearances in his freshman year with the Dukes. He was considered rookie of the year and player of the match in various occasions.

Professional
On 7 December 2015, it was announced that Narbón had signed for United Soccer League expansion club FC Cincinnati.

Narbón signed with Seattle Sounders FC 2 on March 24, 2017, as part of the team's preparation for the 2017 season.

One Thursday night in a match in Tacoma versus Swope Park Rangers, Francisco Narbón received a horrible tackle to his right leg causing a fracture in both his right tibia and fibula. He successfully underwent surgery at Virginia Mason Medical Center in downtown Seattle. The procedure was performed by Dr. David J. Belfie of Virginia Mason Orthopedics and Sports Medicine.

Without hesitation Narbon returned to the pitch as soon as his medics gave him the GO.
Narbon signed with Panama's historic team Plaza Amador. In his first year he scored three goals in three consecutive matches leading his team to the semifinals, taking over as leader in his first season there... earning him a call to Senior National Panama Team for a game vs. Mexico in a CONCACAF Nations League.

International
He played for Panama at the 2011 FIFA U-17 World Cup in Mexico as well as at the 2015 FIFA U-20 World Cup in New Zealand.

On August 6, 2014, Narbon made his senior national team debut for Panama in a 3–0 defeat to Peru.  He was also called up for Panama's final two matches of the 2014 Copa Centroamericana, but didn't feature in any of them.

References

External links

James Madison University bio

1995 births
Living people
Sportspeople from Panama City
Association football defenders
Panamanian footballers
Panamanian expatriate footballers
Expatriate soccer players in the United States
Panama international footballers
2014 Copa Centroamericana players
2015 CONCACAF U-20 Championship players
James Madison Dukes men's soccer players
FC Cincinnati (2016–18) players
Tacoma Defiance players
USL Championship players
C.D. Plaza Amador players
Footballers at the 2015 Pan American Games
Pan American Games competitors for Panama